Clinical Medicine Insights: Oncology is a peer-reviewed open access academic journal focusing on clinical applications of oncology. The journal was founded in 2007, and was originally published by Libertas Academica, but SAGE Publications became the publisher in September 2016. The editor in chief is William Chi-shing Cho.

Indexing
The journal is indexed in
Emerging Sources Citation Index
PubMed/PubMed Central
Scopus
Selected EBSCO & Gale databases

References

External links
 

Oncology journals
Publications established in 2007
English-language journals
SAGE Publishing academic journals
Open access journals